Too Busy to Work may refer to:
 Too Busy to Work (1932 film), an American drama film
 Too Busy to Work (1939 film), an American comedy film